The 2018 IHF Super Globe was the twelfth edition of the tournament. It was held in Doha, Qatar at the Duhail Handball Sports Hall from 16 to 19 October 2018.

In a rematch of last year's final, Barcelona won their fourth title after a 29–24 final win over Berlin.

Venue
The championship was played in Doha, at the Duhail Handball Sports Hall.

Teams
The best club of each continent through their tournaments, the defending champion, a host team and a wild card team participated. Hammamat participated because the winner of the 2017 African Champions League (Zamalek) refused to participate for political reasons. The runner up (Espérance Tunis) was denied for not participating in the previous 2 African Champions League. The 3rd place (Al Ahly), who was from Egypt, refused to participate for political reasons.

Results
All times are local (UTC+3).

Bracket

5th place bracket

Quarterfinals

5–8th place semifinals

Semifinals

Seventh place game

Fifth place game

Third place game

Final

Final ranking

Top scorers

Source: IHF

References

External links
Official website

2018 in handball
2018
2018 in Qatari sport
International handball competitions hosted by Qatar
Handball in Qatar
October 2018 sports events in Asia